Yên Châu is a district (huyện) of Sơn La province in the Northwest region of Vietnam. As of 2003 the district had a population of 62,883. The district covers an area of 844 km². The district capital is the eponymous Yên Châu.

References

Districts of Sơn La province
Sơn La province